Anne of the Palatinate known in France as Anne of Bavaria, Princess Palatine (Anne Henriette Julie; 13 March 1648 – 23 February 1723) was a Princess of the Palatinate and Countess Palatine of Simmern by birth and was the wife of Henri Jules de Bourbon eldest son of Louis, Grand Condé. Following her father-in-law's death, her husband succeeded as Prince of Condé, a purely honorary title, but one of the highest ranking in France. She was also the Princesse of Arches and Charleville in her own right from 1708.

Biography

Anne was born in Paris the second of the three daughters of Prince Palatine Edward. Her mother was Anna Gonzaga, a well known Parisian political hostess and sister of the Queen of Poland.

At the age of fifteen, she was engaged to Henri Jules, Duke of Enghien, the only surviving child of the famous military commander the Grand Condé. The Grand Condé was the most senior Prince du Sang at the French court ("First Prince of the Blood"). Henri Jules was his heir and prior to his succession to the purely honorary title of Prince of Condé, was styled the Duke of Enghien and was addressed Monsieur le Duc. The marriage ceremony took place at the Palais du Louvre on 11 December 1663 with Louis XIV of France and the rest of the royal family in attendance. At this time, Anne  became Madame la Duchesse, as Duchess of Enghien. At the death of her father-in-law in 1684, Anne took on the style of Madame la Princesse. She was also known as Anne, princesse Palatine.

Anne and Henri Jules had ten children. Henri Jules, who suffered from clinical lycanthropy, was greatly supported by his wife. Anne was described as very pious, generous, and charitable, and was praised by many at court for her very supportive nature towards her husband. Despite that, her husband, who was prone to great rages, would often beat his quiet wife, even in the presence of other courtiers. Of her many children, only five survived childhood, four of whom went on to marry.

Her mother was instrumental in helping bring about a marriage between her niece by marriage, Elisabeth Charlotte of the Palatinate and the brother of Louis XIV, Philippe, Duke of Orléans in 1671. Elisabeth Charlotte was Anne's first cousin, their fathers being brothers. In 1708, when her cousin Charles IV, Duke of Mantua died, being his heiress, Anne Henriette became the Princess of Arches in her own right. Charles IV was the last Duke of Mantua. The next year, Anne's husband died in Paris on 1 April 1709, aged 65, making her son, Louis, the next Prince of Condé.

Louis died the next year and his son Louis Henri, Duke of Bourbon became the next holder of the title.  Anne also owned the Château du Raincy which was sold to the House of Orléans in 1769. She died in Paris at the age of 74, having outlived her husband and all but two of her children, namely the Princess of Conti and the Duchess of Maine. On her death, the principality of Arches became extinct; the title was claimed by her son, the Prince of Condé and her nephew, the son of her sister, Louise Marie of Bavaria. She was buried at the Carmel du Faubourg Saint-Jacques in Paris.

Legacy
Anne was the princess for whom the Rue Palatine was named - the road in the 6th arrondissement of Paris where she had lived in the Petit Luxembourg, next to the Luxembourg Palace in Paris.

Issue
Anne had ten children, only half of whom lived to adulthood.

Ancestry

References

Arches, Princess of
1648 births
1723 deaths
201
Nobility from Paris
17th-century French people
18th-century French people
Princesses of Condé
Princesses of the Blood
Duchesses of Enghien
Princesses of the Palatinate
House of Bourbon-Condé
House of Palatinate-Simmern
Countesses Palatine of the Holy Roman Empire
Burials at the Carmel du faubourg Saint-Jacques
18th-century peers of France
Peers created by Louis XIV
17th-century German women
17th-century French women
18th-century German women
18th-century French women